This is a list of properties listed on the National Register of Historic Places in Wilmington, Delaware:

For reasons of size, the listings in New Castle County are divided into three lists: those in Wilmington, other listings in northern New Castle County (north of the Chesapeake and Delaware Canal), and those in southern New Castle County (south of the Chesapeake and Delaware Canal).

There are 395 properties and districts listed on the National Register in the county. Of these, 87 are in Wilmington. Five of these sites are further designated as National Historic Landmarks.  The locations of National Register properties and districts for which the latitude and longitude coordinates are included below, may be seen in an online map.

{{center|
Contents:  Divisions in Delaware

Current listings 

|}

Former listings 

|}

See also 
National Register of Historic Places listings in Delaware
List of National Historic Landmarks in Delaware
Wilmington Landmarks

References 

Wilmington, Delaware

Wilmington
Wilmington, Delaware